Peggy (also known as The Devil's Pepper Pot) is a 1916 American silent comedy film produced and directed by Thomas Ince and stars Billie Burke in her motion picture debut.

Synopsis
The film follows Peggy Cameron (Burke), a young, high spirited American debutante who is sent to visit her Uncle Andrew (William H. Thompson) and cousin Colin (Charles Ray) in Scotland.

Cast
Billie Burke as Peggy Cameron
William H. Thompson as Andrew Cameron
William Desmond as Reverend Donald Bruce
Charles Ray as Colin Cameron
Nona Thomas as Janet McLeod
Gertrude Claire as Mrs. Cameron
Truly Shattuck as Mrs. Van Allyn
Claire Du Brey (uncredited)

Production

Triangle Film Corporation produced Peggy. Victor L. Schertzinger composed the film's score. In conjunction with the film's release, sheet music of a song, Peggy, was published, the first time a song based on a silent film's incidental music had been written and published. The cover of the sheet music shows Schertzinger as the composer and Ince as the lyricist.

References

External links

 
 

1916 films
1916 comedy films
Silent American comedy films
American silent feature films
American black-and-white films
Films directed by Charles Giblyn
Films directed by Thomas H. Ince
Films set in Scotland
Films shot in Los Angeles
Triangle Film Corporation films
1910s American films